Medicine Bow Peak is the highest peak in the Snowy Range, a part of the Medicine Bow Mountains, about  west of Laramie, Wyoming.  It lies within Medicine Bow National Forest and is the highest point in southern Wyoming.  The summit lies in extreme western Albany County, but the mountain's lower reaches  stretch westward into eastern Carbon County.  The summit is 12,018 feet (3,663 m) high and is visible from Snowy Range Pass, elevation 10,847 ft (3,300 m), on Wyoming Highway 130, a Wyoming Scenic Byway. The most commonly used trail to the peak is a four-mile hike featuring switch-backs and a great deal of loose rock.  The trails to the peak are usually open from early June to mid October.

The mountain is usually covered with snow from October to late June. During winter the peak can be reached by snowshoe or by skiing. Summer conditions can be extreme, with frequent thunderstorms and hail during the afternoons.

Geology

The peak is part of a proterozoic quartzite ridge that juts above the Snowy Range. It was glaciated until quite recently, and year-round snowfields are still present on its flanks. Periglacial polygons, also known as "stone nets", are located above the timberline. Several glacial lakes are located at the base of the peak.

Geologic publications have suggested that the Snowy Pass Supergroup at the peak is significantly older than, and unrelated to, the orogeny of the surrounding Medicine Bow mountains. These publications often refer to the mountain as "Medicine Peak", and its rock as "Precambrian Medicine Peak Quartzite". The quartzite, which lies unconformably on gneissic basement rock, has been analyzed for traces of Precambrian life. The findings may be pseudofossils.

History

Little is known of the mountain's history before the John C. Frémont expeditions of 1843 - 1844. Native American tribes such as the Northern Arapahoe, Northern Cheyenne, Lakota,
Ute, and Eastern Shoshone were known to have either inhabited the surrounding lowlands or used nearby canyons and mountain passes as travel routes.

In 1955, United Airlines Flight 409 crashed into the side of the mountain; there were no survivors. Engines and other fragments of the plane are still present at the base of the cliff. During the recovery process, several additional access routes were established, which are still in use today.

A memorial stone and plaque were placed near the crash site, known as "Disaster Wall", in August 2001.

Ecology

Biomes on the trails leading to the peak include alpine meadows, sub-alpine meadows, and taiga. Stunted and twisted Krummholtz trees, many of which are Engelmann spruce, are common at or just above the tree line. The wildflowers along its access trails include Indian Paintbrush, blue columbine, gentian, and harebell. The peak is located in a Special Botanical Area.

Mammals inhabiting the peak and its immediate surroundings include bighorn sheep, marmots, pikas, pine martens, mule deer, moose, and dwarf shrew.

Maps
 Medicine Bow Peak page at peakbagger.com
 TopoQuest.com Topographic map of Medicine Bow Peak
 Medicine Bow Peak Trail Review from Trails.com
 Photos of the peak and its access trails
 US Forest Service Medicine Bow - Routt National Forests

References

Mountains of Albany County, Wyoming
Mountains of Carbon County, Wyoming
Mountains of Wyoming
Medicine Bow National Forest